Henrietta Street in the Bathwick area of Bath, Somerset, England was built around 1785 by Thomas Baldwin.

Numbers 1 to 35 were built together in a terrace with a consistent style of 3 storey houses. They complement the surrounding Georgian buildings and layout of Laura Place, Great Pulteney Street and Johnstone Street.

See also

 List of Grade I listed buildings in Bath and North East Somerset

References

Houses completed in 1785
Grade I listed buildings in Bath, Somerset
Streets in Bath, Somerset